Bernardo Aliprandi ( ?Milan 1710c – Frankfurt 1792c) was an Italian composer and cellist.

Life 
Aliprandi first appears in the records of Ospedale dei Mendicati in Venice where he was nominated viola teacher in 1726. Another record in the same institute mentions his leave for the Bavarian court in 1732. In 1737 he succeeded Giovanni Battista Ferrandini as composer of chamber music and in 1744 he was promoted Konzertmeister. He retired in 1778. In 1791 he was living in Frankfurt. A document reports him dead by 1793.

Compositions 
Mitridate (B. Pasqualigo, 1738)
Semiramide riconosciuta (Metastasio, 1740)
Apollo trà le muse in Parnasso (Perozzo do Perozzi, 1737)
Vocatio tertia ad nuptias filii regis (G. Arnold, 1737)
De via a caelo (Neumayr, 1738)
Iphigenia in Aulide (Munich, 1739), probably by Giovanni Porta
Mitridate
Stabat mater for soprano, alto and chamber (1749) (D-Dl). 
18 sinfonias are listed in the 1753 catalogue of the Munich Hofkapelle

Sources 
Jolando Scarpa (ed.): Arte e musica all'Ospedaletto. Schede d'archivio sull'attività musicale degli Ospedali dei Derelitti e dei Mendicanti di Venezia (sec. XVI–XVIII).
James L. Jackman: Aliprandi, Bernardo in  The New Grove Dictionary of Music and Musicians.

External links
 , Stabat Mater, Mus.2654-D-1 at SLUB

1710 births
1792 deaths
Italian male classical composers
18th-century Italian composers
18th-century Venetian people
18th-century Italian male musicians